Alan Wheelhouse (4 March 1934 – 28 August 1998) was an English first-class cricketer active 1958–61 who played for Nottinghamshire. He was born in Nottingham; died in Caythorpe.

References

External links

1934 births
1998 deaths
English cricketers
Nottinghamshire cricketers
Cambridge University cricketers